Tim C. Lawson is a retired United States Army major general who last served as the mobilization assistant to the commander of the United States Space Command. He previously served as the deputy commanding general for operations of the United States Army Space and Missile Defense Command.

Awards and decorations

References

Living people
Recipients of the Legion of Merit
United States Army generals
United States Army personnel of the Gulf War
United States Army personnel of the War in Afghanistan (2001–2021)
Year of birth missing (living people)